Eucalyptus fulgens, commonly known as green scentbark, is a small to medium-sized tree that is endemic to Victoria, Australia.

Description
It has thick, fibrous dark grey bark on the trunk and larger branches, sometimes smooth bark on the thin branches. Flowering occurs in autumn and the flowers are white.

Taxonomy and naming
Eucalyptus fulgens was first formally described in 1996 by Kevin James Rule in the journal Muelleria, from a specimen he collected from Upper Beaconsfield. The specific epithet (fulgens) is derived from a Latin word alluding to the lustrous appearance of the adult leaves.

Distribution and habitat
This eucalypt grows in heavy soils over sandstone between Healesville, Woori Yallock and Driffield in the Latrobe Valley.

Use in horticulture
This species is suitable as a shade tree for moist, but not wet areas and is bird and butterfly attracting.

See also
List of Eucalyptus species

References

Flora of Victoria (Australia)
Trees of Australia
fulgens
Myrtales of Australia
Plants described in 1996